The Mirage 35 is a Canadian sailboat, that was designed by American Robert Perry and first built in 1983.

The Mirage 35 design was developed from the Mirage 33 of 1982.

Production
The boat was built by Mirage Yachts in Canada, starting in 1983, but it is now out of production.

Design

The Mirage 35 differs from the very similar Miarge 33 only in fitting a reverse transom, which adds  to the length overall, but does not affect the boat's other dimensions.

It is a small recreational keelboat, built predominantly of fibreglass. It has a masthead sloop rig, an internally-mounted spade-type rudder and a fixed fin keel. It displaces  and carries  of ballast.

The boat has a PHRF racing average handicap of 150 with a high of 156 and low of 144.

Operational history
In a review Michael McGoldrick wrote, "For all practical purposes, the Mirage 33 and 35 are the same boat. The water line, sail area, beam, draft, and interior layout of these two boats is identical. The main difference is that the Mirage 35 has a reverse transom, weighs a few hundred pounds more, and has an overall length that's two feet longer than the 33 foot model. The 35 footer is also supposed to have been built with a slightly nicer interior. These boats have a fairly large interior which featured 6' 5" (1.96m) of headroom. In their day, the beams of these boats would have been considered slightly wider than average, and this would have been especially true of the 33 foot model."

See also
List of sailing boat types

Related development
Mirage 33

Similar sailboats
C&C 34/36
C&C 36R
C&C 35
Cal 35
Cal 35 Cruise
Express 35
Freedom 35
Goderich 35
Hughes 36
Hughes-Columbia 36
Hunter 35 Legend
Hunter 35.5 Legend
Hunter 356
Island Packet 35
J/35
Landfall 35
Niagara 35
Southern Cross 35

References

Keelboats
1980s sailboat type designs
Sailing yachts
Sailboat type designs by Robert Perry
Sailboat types built by Mirage Yachts